Black refugees were black people who escaped slavery in the United States during the War of 1812 and settled in Nova Scotia, New Brunswick, and Trinidad. The term is used in Canada for those who settled in Nova Scotia and New Brunswick. They were the most numerous of the African Americans who sought freedom during the War of 1812. The Black refugees were the second group of African Americans, after the Black Loyalists, to flee American enslavement in wartime and settle in Canada. They make up the most significant single immigration source for today's African Nova Scotian communities. During the antebellum period, however, an estimated 10,000 to 30,000 Black refugees reached freedom in Canada, often traveling alone or in small family groups. 

Those who settled in Trinidad were generally from Virginia and Maryland, and Georgia and Spanish Florida, via Bermuda, where they were evacuated on British ships from the East Coast. Some were settled in Trinidad in 1815. Those African Americans who bore arms for the British in the second Corps of Colonial Marines, recruited from the younger of the total of 4,000 refugees, settled in Trinidad in 1816, where they became known as the Merikins (also spelled as Merikens).

Background

During 1813 and the War of 1812 with the United States, Vice Admiral Warren was ordered to receive aboard his ships any blacks who might petition him for assistance. These he was to receive as free men, not as slaves, and send them to any of several of His Majesty's colonies. Captain Robert Barrie of  reported to Admiral Warren "there is no doubt but the blacks of Virginia and Maryland would cheerfully take up arms and join us against the Americans." By the time that the Admiralty received the report, they had already decided to order Warren's successor, Vice-Admiral Sir Alexander Cochrane, to encourage emigration of African-American slaves.

As with the precedents of Lord Dunmore's Proclamation of November 7, 1775 and the Philipsburg Proclamation, Cochrane issued a Proclamation in partial implementation of instructions from his superiors. He made no explicit mention of slaves, although he presumed it would be read as encouraging them to join the British:

 'A Proclamation

 Whereas it has been represented to me that many persons now resident in the United States have expressed a desire to withdraw therefrom with a view to entering into His Majesty's service, or of being received as free settlers into some of His Majesty's colonies.

 This is therefore to give notice that all persons who may be disposed to migrate from the United States, will with their families, be received on board of His Majesty's ships or vessels of War, or at the military posts that may be established upon or near the coast of the United States, when they will have their choice of either entering into His Majesty's sea or land forces, or of being sent as free settlers to the British possessions in North America or the West Indies where they will meet with due encouragement.

 Given under my hand at Bermuda this second day of April, 1814, by command of Vice Admiral.

 Alex Cochrane'

Cochrane's proclamation made no mention of slaves, and it was widely misinterpreted by some American slaveholders as an incitement to violent revolt by their slaves.

The flow of African-American refugees to the British had already been considerable. Cochrane's action did no more than confirm what had been happening for over a year. Some years after the arrival in Nova Scotia of the Black refugees, a plan was proposed for them to be sent to the Colony of Freetown, Sierra Leone. Nearly 2,000 of their African-American brethren had relocated there in the late 18th century, but the plan was only partly fulfilled. For the most part the Black refugees remained in Nova Scotia and New Brunswick. A small group responded to a related invitation to move to Trinidad.

To a limited extent like the Black Loyalists, some of the Black refugees' names were recorded in a document called the Halifax List: Return of American Refugee Negroes who have been received into the Province of Nova Scotia from the United States of America between 27 April 1815 and 24 October 1818. This list took no account of the considerable number of African Americans who had arrived earlier.

Outcome
In total, about 4000 Africans escaped to the British by way of the Royal Navy, the largest group emancipation of African Americans prior to the American Civil War.  About 2000 settled in Nova Scotia and about 400 settled in New Brunswick. Together they were the largest single source of African-American immigrants, whose descendants formed the core of African Canadians.

Black refugees in Nova Scotia were first housed in the former prisoner-of-war camp on Melville Island. After the War of 1812, it was adapted as an immigration facility. From Melville Island, they moved to settlements around Halifax and in the Annapolis Valley. These settlements were given as licensed property for the refugees entering Nova Scotia. While it wasn't land they owned completely, it gave the refugees the chance to start communities of their own. The passengers on the shipwrecked HMS Atalante (1808) included twenty American refugee slaves from the James River in Virginia. They were among the first of the Black refugees of the War of 1812 to reach Canada.

Other Black refugees were settled in Trinidad, most having served in the Corps of Colonial Marines. They included around 200 refugees from Louisiana and East and West Florida. The community in Trinidad became known as the Merikins and their villages, established by members of different companies, still exist.

Descendants
The Black refugees make up the largest single source of ancestors for Black Nova Scotians and formed the core of African Nova Scotian communities and churches that still exist today. But an estimated 10,000 to 30,000 refugees arrived individually or in small family groups during the antebellum years, seeking freedom from slavery along the Underground Railroad from the United States. 

Large numbers of Black refugees settled in North and East Preston, Nova Scotia, where their descendants still live. Many other Black refugees settled in smaller communities, such as Hammonds Plains, Beechville, Windsor and communities throughout the Nova Scotia's Annapolis Valley. Some Black refugee families moved closer to Halifax for employment opportunities in the 1840s, forming the Halifax community of Africville. 

The migration included the religious leader and abolitionist Richard Preston, who established the first African Baptist church in Halifax, and the parents of William Hall, one of Canada's first winners of a Victoria Cross. The Black refugees in Nova Scotia were largely from Virginia and Maryland, and they brought basket-making skills from the Chesapeake Region. These are still practiced by their descendants. These baskets are very distinct in style from the existing Mi'kmaw and Acadian basket-making styles by other ethnic groups in the region.

See also 
Black Nova Scotians

References

Sources
  The immigration and settlement of the black refugees of the War of 1812 in Nova Scotia and New Brunswick
Harvey Amani Whitfield, Blacks on the Border: The Black Refugees in British North America, 1815-1860, University of Vermont Press, 2006
War of 1812
"Africville; Canada’s Most Famous Black Community", DaCosta 400
Harvey Amani Whitfield, "The Development of Black Refugee Identity in Nova Scotia: 1813-1850"
"Black Refugees", Nova Scotia Archives and Records Management

External links
Flight to Freedom: Slavery and the Underground Railroad in Maryland

Military history of Nova Scotia
History of immigration to Canada
American rebel slaves
African-American diaspora
Black Loyalists
Black Refugees from the War of 1812
Slavery in the United States
Immigration to Nova Scotia